Tiksi Bay (Bukhta Tiksi) is a bay of the Laptev Sea that cuts into the northern part of the Sakha Republic, Russia.

History
This bay was first surveyed by Russian Arctic explorer Dmitry Laptev in 1739. It was then called "Gorely Bay". The name "Tiksi Bay" was adopted in 1878.

There is a cross at Tiksi Bay marking the place of death of U. S. whaling captain Thomas Long.

Geography
The bay is up to 21 km long, 17 km wide and has a depth of 2 to 11 metres. The Sogo and Yuryage Rivers discharge into the bay.

The port of Tiksi lies on the west side.

Semidiurnal tides in the Kola Bay are about 0.3 metres. In winter the bay is clogged by ice.

References 

 This article is based on a translation of the equivalent article of the Russian Wikipedia on 11 February 2009.

Bays of the Laptev Sea
Bays of the Sakha Republic